"Rush Hour" is an instrumental composition by American DJ Christopher Lawrence. It was released as a 12-inch single in 2000, featuring the song "Ride the Light" as a B-side. A shorter version of "Rush Hour" later appeared on Lawrence's debut studio album, All or Nothing, which was released in 2004. The track peaked at number 118 on the UK Singles Chart. It was also featured on the soundtrack for the video game Need for Speed: Underground 2.

Track listing
 Hook — HK047

Charts

Release history

References

2000 singles
2000 songs